Micklethwaite is an area of Wetherby on the south bank of the River Wharfe in West Yorkshire, England.  It is in the City of Leeds metropolitan borough. It was once a separate village but has been incorporated into Wetherby.  In 2004 150 houses were constructed on Micklethwaite Farm.  It is the location of Wetherby's police station, the former magistrates' court, the leisure centre, Wetherby Athletic Football Club and a Mercure Hotel.

Micklethwaite had a public house, the Drover Inn which is now a private residence.  With the advent of the railway, cattle were no longer driven over the bridge and the pub changed its name to the Spotted Ox.  A barracks was built in 1825 to house the Yorkshire Hussars in case of civil disturbances anticipated in Leeds at the time of the Chartists.

Micklethwaite is considered an upmarket area. Any part of Wetherby south of the River Wharfe is Micklethwaite.

People 
Karen Drury, best known for her role as Susannah Morrisey in Channel 4 soap, Brookside grew up in Micklethwaite.

References

Places in Leeds
Areas of Wetherby